Robert P. Horgos (born May 17, 1948) is a former Democratic member of the Pennsylvania House of Representatives.

References

Democratic Party members of the Pennsylvania House of Representatives
Living people
1948 births